St. Aloysius College (: Colegio San Luis) is a mixed-gender Catholic school in Manizales, Caldas, Colombia serving two years of kindergarten through grade 11.

The school was established by the Society of Jesus in 1954. Initially, it offered classes for boys for grade five of primary school and grades one and two of high school. The following year, construction began on the current school building. The school moved to coeducation in the 1980s.

See also

 Education in Colombia
 List of Jesuit schools

References

External link
 

Jesuit secondary schools in Colombia
Jesuit primary schools in Colombia
Educational institutions established in 1954
Buildings and structures in Manizales
1954 establishments in Colombia